Karl-Heinz Lappe (born 14 September 1987) is a German footballer who plays as a forward for TSV Buchbach.

Career
Lappe had played in Bayern Munich youth system, but was released at a young age and went on to forge a career in amateur football in Bavaria. In January 2009 he signed for FC Ingolstadt 04 to play for the reserve team in the Bayernliga, and scored on his debut, the fourth in a 5–1 win over FC Memmingen after he'd come on as a substitute for Ivan Santini. He ended the 2008–09 season with eight goals in thirteen appearances for Ingolstadt II, finishing as the team's joint top scorer with Stefan Müller.

Lappe was the team's top scorer both the 2009–10 season (17 goals) and the 2010–11 season (13 goals), as they finished in second place behind FC Ismaning – enough to earn promotion to the Regionalliga Süd, as Ismaning denied the opportunity to go up. Ingolstadt II finished in seventh place in the 2011–12 season, with Lappe scoring 18 goals - more than anyone else in the division. This earned him a call-up to the first-team - he made four appearances in the 2. Bundesliga, his debut as a substitute for Ahmed Akaïchi in a 2–0 defeat against TSV 1860 Munich in November 2011.

Lappe was not involved in the Ingolstadt first team at the beginning of the 2012–13 season, but scored prolifically for the reserves, now in the Regionalliga Bayern, following a restructuring of the league. 21 goals before the winter-break saw him brought back in the first-team fold, and he made an immediate impact, scoring the opening goal in a 2–0 win over FSV Frankfurt, his first 2. Bundesliga goal.

References

External links
 
 

1987 births
Living people
German footballers
Association football forwards
SpVgg Unterhaching players
FC Unterföhring players
FC Ingolstadt 04 players
FC Ingolstadt 04 II players
FC Bayern Munich II players
1. FSV Mainz 05 II players
Türkgücü München players
TSV Buchbach players
2. Bundesliga players
Regionalliga players
Footballers from Munich